The 11th Lo Nuestro Awards ceremony, presented by Univision honoring the best Latin music of 1998 and 1999 took place on May 6, 1999, at a live presentation held at the James L. Knight Center in Miami, Florida. The ceremony was broadcast in the United States and Latin America by Univision.

During the ceremony, nineteen categories were presented. Winners were announced at the live event and included Puerto-Rican American singer Elvis Crespo receiving five competitive awards. Other multiple winners were Mexican singer-songwriter Pepe Aguilar with three wins, fellow Mexican band Maná and Colombian performer Shakira with two awards each. Aguilar earned the award for Regional Mexican Album of the Year, Crespo won for Tropical/Salsa Album of the Year, and the Pop Album of the Year was presented as a tie between Maná and Shakira. A special tribute was given to Mexican singer Pedro Fernández and the Excellence Award was received by Mexican group Los Tigres del Norte.

Background 
In 1989, the Lo Nuestro Awards were established by Univision, to recognize the most talented performers of Latin music. The nominees and winners were selected by a voting poll conducted among program directors of Spanish-language radio stations in the United States and the results were tabulated and certified by the accounting firm Arthur Andersen. The categories included are for the Pop, Tropical/Salsa, Regional Mexican and Music Video. The trophy awarded is shaped like a treble clef. The 11th Lo Nuestro Awards ceremony was held on May 7, 1999, in a live presentation held at the James L. Knight Center in Miami, Florida. The ceremony was broadcast in the United States and Latin America by Univision.

Winners and nominees 

Winners were announced before the live audience during the ceremony. Puerto-Rican American singer Elvis Crespo was the most nominated performer, with six nominations which resulted in five wins which included Tropical/Salsa Male Performer, Album of the Year, Song of the Year, Best New Artist and Group or Duo of the Year (shared with Milly Quezada). Mexican singer-songwriter Pepe Aguilar dominated the Regional/Mexican field winning three awards including Male Artist, Album of the Year and Song of the Year.

Three songs nominated for Pop Song of the Year reached number one at the Billboard Top Latin Songs chart: Ricky Martin's "Vuelve", Shakira's "Ciega, Sordomuda" and Chayanne's "Dejaría Todo"; Spanish performer Enrique Iglesias earned the accolade for Best Music Video for "Esperanza". The Pop Album of the Year was shared by Mexican band Maná and Colombian singer Shakira with Sueños Líquidos and Dónde Están los Ladrones?, respectively. Both albums were nominated at the 41st Grammy Awards for Best Latin Rock/Alternative Performance with Maná receiving the award. Puerto-Rican American performer Ricky Martin performed at the Grammy Awards the song "The Cup of Life", and the Spanish-language version won the Pop Song of the Year at the Lo Nuestro Awards.

Honorary awards
Song of the Century: "Bésame Mucho" by Consuelo Velázquez.
Excellence Award: Los Tigres del Norte.<
Special Tribute: Pedro Fernández.

See also
1998 in Latin music
1999 in Latin music
Grammy Award for Best Latin Pop Album
Grammy Award for Best Latin Rock/Alternative Performance
Grammy Award for Best Traditional Tropical Latin Album

References

1999 music awards
Lo Nuestro Awards by year
1999 in Florida
1999 in Latin music
1990s in Miami